Luminous Orange is an alternative rock band formed 1992 in Yokohama, Japan. The band has evolved from an all female group to a solo project headed by composer, singer & guitarist Rie Takeuchi.

Members
 Rie Takeuchi (composer, singer, guitarist, etc.)

Current supporting musicians
 Takehito Kouno (B) – Mahiruno
 Katsuya Yanagawa (G) – Caucus
 Kensuke Nishiura (Dr) – Sōtaiseiriron
 HIroko Kawakami (Cho) – Caucus

Past members
 Kazuko Sakamoto (B)
 Mieko Okazaki (Dr)
 Kaname Banba (Dr)
 Tarow Nisawa (B)

About
Originally conceived as a 4-piece girl band, Luminous Orange went through several member changes, resulting in 2002, it becoming the solo project of its composer, singer & guitarist, Rie Takeuchi.  The group has often been categorized as Alternative, Dreampop, and Shoegaze. From the fact that they had released some of their material from Cornelius' label "Trattoria", they are often considered as one of the Shibuya-kei artists.

The group has inspired fellow and follower musicians such as Number Girl, Hidaka from Beat Crusaders and Condor44. Cornelius and Ian Masters (Pale Saints) were drawn to the band's sound and released Luminous Orange's material under their Trattoria and Friendly Science labels, respectively. This move resulted in good chart action and the accumulated sales of 22,000 copies.

The band is also active in playing abroad. Although they couldn't meet the request to play at Collette Millennium Party in Paris 2001 and CMJ Music Marathon 2001 (due to 9/11), they played at CMJ 2004 and SXSW 2006 & 2007 with good response. In Taiwan, they participated in the Formoz Festival 2007, at which Yo La Tengo and Buffalo Daughter, also played.

Rie has also sung on a couple of tracks of Ian Masters' Friendly Science Orchestra single, Miniature Album. The single was selected as 'Single of The Week' by NME. Ian also sang with Luminous Orange as a guest vocalist on two occasions.

Discography

Albums

Vivid Short Trip (1996)
Waiting for the Summer (1997)
Sugarcoated (1998)
Drop You Vivid Colours (2002)
Vivid Short Trip 7 Stops Farther (Reissue) (2004)
Sakura Swirl (2007)
Songs of Innocence (2010)
Soar, Kiss The Moon (2014)

EPs

Puppy Dog Mail EP (1998)
luminousorangesuperplastic (1999)
luminousorangesugarplastic (2000)

Compilation(s)

Best of Luminous Orange (2009)

External links
 Luminous Orange Official Website
 Luminous Orange Myspace
 Institute of Spoons(Friendly Science Enregisterments)
 Music Related

Japanese alternative rock groups
Musical groups from Kanagawa Prefecture